Palatka station is a historic train station that was built in Palatka, Florida in 1908. The station currently serves Amtrak's Silver Service line and also houses the Palatka Railroad Preservation Society and the David Browning Railroad Museum. It is located at 220 North Eleventh Street, at the corner of North Eleventh Street's intersection with US 17/SR 100.

History 
The station was built in 1908 for the Atlantic Coast Line Railroad (ACL) and was constructed in the Richardsonian Romanesque style. It served as a union depot for the ACL's Jacksonville-Tampa-Sarasota mainline as well as for the Florida Southern Railway and the Georgia Southern and Florida Railway. In addition to local service to Sarasota, the station served the ACL's West Coast Champion (New York City – Sarasota). In 1914 the station began to serve the short-lived Ocklawaha Valley Railroad. In 1988, it was added to the National Register of Historic Places.

In 1971, most passenger service in the United States was transferred to Amtrak, however Palatka had its stop discontinued. In 1976, Amtrak decided to reinstate the stop at Palatka, under a trial period. They would later add Palatka as a permanent stop in 1979. The station is currently served by Amtrak's Silver Meteor and Silver Star trains.

In November of 2021, the US Department of Transportation awarded $1.5 billion in RAISE discretionary grants for infrastructure projects around the nation. One such grant awarded $8.2 million to fund the development of the A. Philip Randolph Regional Multimodal Transportation Hub. Under this redevelopment, the station's platform will be lengthened to accommodate a baggage area and raised to meet ADA requirements, and allow bicycles to be loaded and unloaded at the station. Other improvements around the station include resurfacing the roadway, installing new ADA-compliant sidewalks and curb and gutter designating bike lanes, and adding other accessory safety improvements in the project area. It is likely that the station's agent will be reinstated under this redevelopment to help with what will be the newly-introduced checked baggage service.

David Browning Railroad Museum 
The station is home to the David Browning Railroad Museum, operated by the Palatka Railroad Preservation Society. The museum features a model train layout, historic documents, photographs, maps, signs and railroad artifacts.

References

External links 

Palatka's Historic Union Depot

Palatka, Florida
Tourist attractions in Palatka, Florida
Railway stations on the National Register of Historic Places in Florida
Amtrak stations in Florida
Transportation buildings and structures in Putnam County, Florida
Railroad museums in Florida
Palatka Railroad Station
Palatka Railroad Station
Museums in Putnam County, Florida
Union stations in the United States
Railway stations in the United States opened in 1909
National Register of Historic Places in Putnam County, Florida
Model railway shows and exhibitions
1908 establishments in Florida